The Cabinet of Bárður á Steig Nielsen was the government of the Faroe Islands between 16 September 2019 and 9 November 2022, with Bárður á Steig Nielsen from Union Party as Prime Minister, making a coalition between People's Party and Centre Party.

During the campaign for the November 2022 Danish general election, Centre Party leader and Faroese Minister of Foreign Affairs Jenis av Rana stated that he could not support Søren Pape Poulsen, the leader of the Conservative People's Party, becoming Prime Minister of Denmark as Poulsen is gay.

The opposition parties in the Løgting planned to call a motion of no confidence on 8 November 2022, but á Steig Nielsen sacked av Rana the same day. The Centre Party subsequently withdrew from the government, resulting in it losing its majority and Nielsen calling early elections.

Composition

See also 
Cabinet of the Faroe Islands
List of members of the parliament of the Faroe Islands, 2019–2022

References 

Cabinets of the Faroe Islands
2019 in the Faroe Islands